Louis de Malet de Puyvallier (Saint-Martin-d'Ary, 10 June 1738 – Saint-Martin-d'Ary, 16 January 1807) was a French Navy officer. He served in the War of American Independence.

Biography 
Malet de Puyvallier was born to a family from Saintonge. He joined the Navy as a Garde-Marine on 16 October 1756. He was promoted to Lieutenant on 4 April 1777.

In 1778, he served as first officer on the 64-gun Vengeur, under Renart d'Amblimont. Later he served on the 80-gun Auguste.

He took part in the Battle of the Chesapeake on 5 September 1781. On 15 September 1782, he was promoted to Captain. He fought on 74-gun Sceptre at the Battle of the Saintes on 12 April 1782,  where he was wounded.

He retired on 24 November 1785. 

He was a member of the Society of the Cincinnati.

Sources and references 
 Notes

Citations

References

 
 
 
 

 

External links
 

French Navy officers
French military personnel of the American Revolutionary War